Dairellidae is a family of amphipods belonging to the order Amphipoda.

Genera:
 Dairella Bovallius, 1887

References

Amphipoda